Rubén Daniel Bentancourt Morales (born 2 March 1993) is a Uruguayan professional footballer who plays as a striker for Peñarol.

Career 
Bentancourt made his professional debut as Jong PSV player in the second division on 19 August 2013 against FC Oss.

On 31 January 2014, he moved from PSV to Serie A side Atalanta for an undisclosed fee.

On 5 August 2014 Atalanta signed Rolando Bianchi from Bologna in a temporary deal, with Bentancourt moved to opposite direction on loan.

On 9 February 2015 he was loaned out by Uruguayan club Defensor Sporting.

On 15 July 2016 he was released by Atalanta.

On 2 September he was signed by Argentine club Defensa y Justicia.

On 28 December 2017 he was signed by Colombian club Independiente Santa Fe.

On 2 August 2021, he joined Peñarol.

Honours

Club
Peñarol
 Uruguayan Primera División: 2021
 Supercopa Uruguaya: 2022

References

External links
 La Gazzetta dello Sport profile (2014–15) 
 

1993 births
Living people
Footballers from Salto, Uruguay
Association football forwards
Uruguayan footballers
Uruguay under-20 international footballers
Eerste Divisie players
Serie A players
Serie B players
Serie C players
Uruguayan Primera División players
Campeonato Brasileiro Série B players
Categoría Primera A players
Ascenso MX players
PSV Eindhoven players
Atalanta B.C. players
Bologna F.C. 1909 players
Defensor Sporting players
S.S. Arezzo players
Defensa y Justicia footballers
Paraná Clube players
Sud América players
Independiente Santa Fe footballers
Atlante F.C. footballers
Boston River players
Peñarol players
Uruguayan expatriate footballers
Uruguayan expatriate sportspeople in the Netherlands
Uruguayan expatriate sportspeople in Italy
Uruguayan expatriate sportspeople in Argentina
Uruguayan expatriate sportspeople in Brazil
Uruguayan expatriate sportspeople in Colombia
Uruguayan expatriate sportspeople in Mexico
Expatriate footballers in the Netherlands
Expatriate footballers in Italy
Expatriate footballers in Argentina
Expatriate footballers in Brazil
Expatriate footballers in Colombia
Expatriate footballers in Mexico